Michael Bosco Duraisamy (born 29 April, 1929 in Aachen) was an Indian prelate and third bishop of the Roman Catholic Diocese of Salem. He was ordained as a priest in the year 1955. He was appointed as bishop of Salem in the year 1974. He died in office in the year 1999 .

References

1929 births
20th-century Roman Catholic bishops in India
1999 deaths